Piper chimborazoense is a species of plant in the family Piperaceae. It is endemic to the western slopes of the Ecuadorean Andes.

References

Flora of Ecuador
chimborazoense
Endangered plants
Taxonomy articles created by Polbot